Spring Valley (North) Airport  is located  north of Spring Valley, Saskatchewan, Canada in the RM of Baildon No. 131. The airport is on the west side of Highway 715.

See also
List of airports in Saskatchewan

References 

Registered aerodromes in Saskatchewan
Baildon No. 131, Saskatchewan